Mario Giovanni Siletti (22 July 1903 – 19 April 1964) was an Italian actor. He was born in Turin. He performed in more than 160 films from 1932 to 1964. He began appearing in American films no later than 1946. From 1962 to 1964, he also portrayed a recurring character, Charlie Carlotti, on the American television series, Hazel. In April 1964, he was killed in a Los Angeles automobile collision caused by a drunk driver. Siletti's pregnant wife was also critically injured in the crash. The driver of the other vehicle was arrested for felony manslaughter.

Selected filmography

References

External links 
 

Italian male film actors
1903 births
1964 deaths
20th-century Italian male actors
Italian emigrants to the United States